Palayathu Amman is a 2000 Indian Tamil-language Hindu devotional film directed by Rama Narayanan. Meena plays the lead role as goddess Amman, while Ramki, Divya Unni, Charan Raj, and Vivek play supporting roles.

Plot
The film starts with a saint in a gurukulam announcing to his students that Devi's birth to kill the evil shall come soon. The Satan kills the saint, but Devi's birth is not stopped. It grows up as a child for Shekar and Savithri. The child gets all kinds of harms from the Satan, but the Goddess Palayathu Amman saves it every time. At the same time, Savithri thinks Palayathu Amman wants to take away her child, so she tries to save it from her. At last, the child is kidnapped and about to be killed when Palayathu Amman kills the Satan and returns the child to her parents.

Cast
 Meena as Palayathu Amman
 Ramki as Shekar
 Divya Unni as Savithri
 Charan Raj as Asureswaran
 Vivek as Kalyanaraman
 Senthil
 Mayilsamy
 Akshya Jayram as school-going Sathya

Production
The film completed its shoot with the working title of Devatha, before the director chose to title the film Palayathu Amman. Vivek comedy in this flim was praised by critics. The Movie became a blockbuster at the box office

Soundtrack
Lyrics were written by Vaali, Kalidasan and Rama Narayanan.

Hindi

References

External links

2002 films
Films shot in Madurai
Indian supernatural thriller films
Hindu devotional films
2000s Tamil-language films
Films directed by Rama Narayanan